This is a list of awards and nominations received by Irish actor Liam Neeson.

Neeson rose to prominence when he starred in the title role as German industrialist Oskar Schindler who is credited with saving the lives of 1,200 Jews during the Holocaust in Steven Spielberg's Academy Award-winning film, Schindler's List (1993). For his performance, he was nominated for an Academy Award, a British Academy Film Award, and a Golden Globe nomination. He also received Golden Globe nominations for his performances as the Irish revolutionary Michael Collins in the film Michael Collins (1996) and as the American biologist and sexologist Dr. Alfred Kinsey in Kinsey (2004).

Neeson is also known for his performances on stage receiving two Tony Award nominations. He received his first Tony Award nomination in 1992 for Best Actor in a Play for his performance as Mat Burke in the Broadway revival of Eugene O'Neill's Anna Christie. He received his second nomination for his performance as John Proctor in the revival of Arthur Miller's The Crucible (2001-2002).

Major associations

Academy Awards

Tony Awards

British Academy Film Award

Golden Globe Awards

Other awards and nominations

Chicago Film Critics Association

Critics' Choice Super Awards

Critics' Choice Television Awards

Dallas–Fort Worth Film Critics Association

Drama Desk Awards

Evening Standard British Film Awards

Independent Spirit Awards

Irish Film and Television Academy

London Film Critics' Circle

Los Angeles Film Critics Association

MTV Movie Awards

Phoenix Film Critics Society

Satellite Awards

Saturn Awards

Vancouver Film Critics Circle

References

External links
 

Neeson, Liam
Fassbender, Michael